George Ivanovich Gurdjieff (c. 1866–1877 – 29 October 1949) was a philosopher, mystic, spiritual teacher, and composer of Armenian  and Greek descent, born in Gyumri, Armenia (then Alexandropol, Russian Empire). Gurdjieff taught that most humans do not possess a unified consciousness and thus live their lives in a state of hypnotic "waking sleep", but that it is possible to awaken to a higher state of consciousness and achieve full human potential. Gurdjieff described a method attempting to do so, calling the discipline "The Work" (connoting "work on oneself") or "the System". According to his principles and instructions, Gurdjieff's method for awakening one's consciousness unites the methods of the fakir, monk and yogi, and thus his student P. D. Ouspensky referred to it as the "Fourth Way".

Gurdjieff's teaching and practice inspired the formation of many groups organized as Foundations, Institutes, and Societies many of which are now connected by the International Association of the Gurdjieff Foundations (IAGF). After his death in 1949, the Gurdjieff Foundation Paris  was organized and led by Jeanne de Salzmann from the early 1950s, in cooperation with other direct pupils, until her death in 1990; and until his death in 2001 by Michel de Salzmann.

The International Association of the Gurdjieff Foundations is an umbrella group for the four main organisations: The Gurdjieff Foundation in the USA, with centers in New York and San Francisco, The Gurdjieff Society in the UK, the Institut Gurdjieff in France and GI Gurdjieff Foundation - Caracas in Venezuela with a network of partner foundations in South America.

Biography

Early years 
Gurdjieff was born to a Caucasus Greek father, Yiannis Georgiades, and an Armenian mother, Evdokia (according to biographer Paul Beekman Taylor), in Alexandropol of the Russian Empire in the Transcaucasus. The name Gurdjieff represents a Russified form of the Pontic Greek surname "Georgiades". Greek-Georgian were also very common combinations in Kars Oblast and Georgia under Tsarist rule, which is also a possible root of his surname, as Muslims around Georgia call the Georgian people "Gurdji" (with Russified ending -eff). The exact year of his birth remains unknown; conjectures range from 1866 to 1877. Some authors (such as James Moore) argue for 1866. Both Olga de Hartmann, the woman Gurdjieff called "the first friend of my inner life", and Louise Goepfert March, Gurdjieff's secretary in the early 1930s, believed that Gurdjieff was born in 1872. A passport gave a birthdate of November 28, 1877, but he once stated that he was born at the stroke of midnight at the beginning of New Year's Day (Julian calendar). Although the dates of his birth vary, the year of 1872 is inscribed in a plate on the gravemarker in the cemetery of Avon, Seine-et-Marne, France, where his body was buried.

Gurdjieff spent his childhood in Kars, which, from 1878 to 1918, was the administrative capital of the Russian-ruled Transcaucasus province of Kars Oblast, a border region recently captured from the Ottoman Empire. It contained extensive grassy plateau-steppe and high mountains, and was inhabited by a multi-ethnic and multi-confessional population that had a history of respect for travelling mystics and holy men, and for religious syncretism and conversion. Both the city of Kars and the surrounding territory were home to an extremely diverse population: although part of the Armenian Plateau, Kars Oblast was home to Armenians, Russians, Caucasus Greeks, Georgians, Turks, Kurds and smaller numbers of Christian communities from eastern and central Europe such as Caucasus Germans, Estonians and Russian sectarian communities like the Molokans, Doukhobors, Pryguny, and Subbotniks. Gurdjieff makes particular mention of the Yazidi community. Growing up in a multi-ethnic society, Gurdjieff became fluent in Armenian, Pontic Greek, Russian and Turkish, speaking the last in a mixture of elegant Osmanlı and some dialect. He later acquired "a working facility with several European languages". Early influences on him included his father, a carpenter and amateur ashik or bardic poet, and the priest of the town's Russian church, Dean Borsh, a family friend. The young Gurdjieff avidly read Russian-language scientific literature. Influenced by these writings, and having witnessed a number of phenomena that he could not explain, he formed the conviction that there existed a hidden truth not to be found in science or in mainstream religion.

Travels
In early adulthood, according to his own account, Gurdjieff's curiosity led him to travel to Central Asia, Egypt, Iran, India, Tibet and Rome before he returned to Russia for a few years in 1912. He was never forthcoming about the source of his teachings. The only account of his wanderings appears in his book Meetings with Remarkable Men. Most commentators leave his background unexplained, and Meetings is not generally considered to be a reliable or straightforward autobiography. Each chapter is named after an individual "remarkable man"; many are putatively members of a society of "seekers of truth".

After Gurdjieff's death, J. G. Bennett researched his sources extensively and suggested that these characters were symbolic of the three types of people to whom Gurdjieff referred: No. 1 centred in their physical body; No. 2 centred in their emotions and No. 3 centred in their minds. He asserts that he has encounters with dervishes, fakirs and descendants of the extinct Essenes, whose teaching had been, he said, conserved at a monastery in Sarmoung. The book also has an overarching quest narrative involving a map of "pre-sand Egypt" and culminating in an encounter with the "Sarmoung Brotherhood".

Business career
Gurdjieff wrote that he supported himself during his travels with odd jobs and trading schemes (one of which he described as dyeing hedgerow birds yellow and selling them as canaries). On his reappearance, as far as the historical record is concerned, he had become a  businessman. His only autobiographical writing concerning this period is The Herald of Coming Good. In it, he mentions acting as hypnotherapist specialising in the cure of addictions and using people as guinea pigs for his methods. It is also speculated that during his travels he was engaged in a certain amount of political activity, as part of The Great Game.

In Russia
From 1913 to 1949, the chronology appears to be based on material that can be confirmed by primary documents, independent witnesses, cross-references and reasonable inference. On New Year's Day in 1912, Gurdjieff arrived in Moscow and attracted his first students, including his cousin, the sculptor Sergey Merkurov, and the eccentric Rachmilievitch. In the same year, he married the Polish Julia Ostrowska in Saint Petersburg. In 1914, Gurdjieff advertised his ballet, The Struggle of the Magicians, and he supervised his pupils' writing of the sketch Glimpses of Truth. In 1915, Gurdjieff accepted P. D. Ouspensky as a pupil, and in 1916, he accepted the composer Thomas de Hartmann and his wife, Olga, as students. Then, he had about 30 pupils. Ouspensky already had a reputation as a writer on mystical subjects and had conducted his own, ultimately disappointing, search for wisdom in the East. The Fourth Way "system" taught during this period was complex and metaphysical, partly expressed in scientific terminology.

In the midst of revolutionary upheaval in Russia, Gurdjieff left Petrograd in 1917 to return to his family home in Alexandropol. During the October Revolution, he set up temporary study communities in Essentuki in the Caucasus, then in Tuapse, Maikop, Sochi and Poti, all on the Black Sea coast of southern Russia, where he worked intensively with many of his Russian pupils. Gurdjieff said, "Begin in Russia, End in Russia".

In March 1918, Ouspensky separated from Gurdjieff, settling in England and teaching the Fourth Way in his own right. The two men were to have a very ambivalent relationship for decades to come.

Four months later, Gurdjieff's eldest sister and her family reached him in Essentuki as refugees, informing him that Turks had shot his father in Alexandropol on 15 May. As Essentuki became more and more threatened by civil war, Gurdjieff fabricated a newspaper story announcing his forthcoming "scientific expedition" to "Mount Induc". Posing as a scientist, Gurdjieff left Essentuki with fourteen companions (excluding Gurdjieff's family and Ouspensky). They travelled by train to Maikop, where hostilities delayed them for three weeks. In spring 1919, Gurdjieff met the artist Alexandre de Salzmann and his wife Jeanne and accepted them as pupils. Assisted by Jeanne de Salzmann, Gurdjieff gave the first public demonstration of his Sacred Dances (Movements at the Tbilisi Opera House, 22 June).

In Georgia and Turkey
In 1919, Gurdjieff and his closest pupils moved to Tbilisi. There, Gurdjieff's wife Julia Ostrowska, the Stjoernvals, the Hartmanns, and the de Salzmanns gathered the fundamentals of his teaching. Gurdjieff concentrated on his still unstaged ballet, The Struggle of the Magicians. Thomas de Hartmann (who had made his debut years ago, before Czar Nicholas II of Russia), worked on the music for the ballet, and Olga Ivanovna Hinzenberg (who years later wed the American architect Frank Lloyd Wright), practiced the ballet dances. In 1919, Gurdjieff established his first Institute for the Harmonious Development of Man.

In late May 1920, when political conditions in Georgia changed and the old order was crumbling, his party travelled to Batumi on the Black Sea coast and then travelled by ship to Istanbul. Gurdjieff rented an apartment on Kumbaracı Street in Péra and later at 13 Abdullatif Yemeneci Sokak near the Galata Tower. The apartment is near the kha'neqa'h (dervish lodge) of the Mevlevi Order (a Sufi order following the teachings of Jalal al-Din Muhammad Rumi), where Gurdjieff, Ouspensky and Thomas de Hartmann witnessed the sema ceremony of the Whirling Dervishes. In Istanbul, Gurdjieff also met his future pupil Capt. John G. Bennett, then head of British Military Intelligence in Constantinople, who describes his impression of Gurdjieff as follows:

It was there that I first met Gurdjieff in the autumn of 1920, and no surroundings could have been more appropriate. In Gurdjieff, East and West do not just meet. Their difference is annihilated in a world outlook which knows no distinctions of race or creed. This was my first, and has remained one of my strongest impressions. A Greek from the Caucasus, he spoke Turkish with an accent of unexpected purity, the accent that one associates with those born and bred in the narrow circle of the Imperial Court. His appearance was striking enough even in Turkey, where one saw many unusual types. His head was shaven, immense black moustache, eyes which at one moment seemed very pale and at another almost black. Below average height, he gave nevertheless an impression of great physical strength

Prieuré at Avon
In August 1921 and 1922, Gurdjieff travelled around western Europe, lecturing and giving demonstrations of his work in various cities, such as Berlin and London. He attracted the allegiance of Ouspensky's many prominent pupils (notably the editor A. R. Orage). After an unsuccessful attempt to gain British citizenship, Gurdjieff established the Institute for the Harmonious Development of Man south of Paris at the Prieuré des Basses Loges in Avon near the famous Château de Fontainebleau. The once-impressive but somewhat crumbling mansion set in extensive grounds housed an entourage of several dozen, including some of Gurdjieff's remaining relatives and some White Russian refugees.

New pupils included C. S. Nott, René Zuber, Margaret Anderson and her ward Fritz Peters.
The generally intellectual and middle-class types who were attracted to Gurdjieff's teaching often found the Prieuré's spartan accommodation and emphasis on hard labour in the grounds disconcerting. Gurdjieff was putting into practice his teaching that people need to develop physically, emotionally and intellectually, hence the mixture of lectures, music, dance, and manual work. Older pupils noticed how the Prieuré teaching differed from the complex metaphysical "system" that had been taught in Russia. In addition to the physical hardships, his personal behaviour towards pupils could be ferocious:

Gurdjieff was standing by his bed in a state of what seemed to me to be
completely uncontrolled fury. He was raging at Orage, who stood impassively,
and very pale, framed in one of the windows.... Suddenly, in the
space of an instant, Gurdjieff's voice stopped, his whole personality changed,
he gave me a broad smile—looking incredibly peaceful and inwardly quiet—
motioned me to leave, and then resumed his tirade with undiminished force.
This happened so quickly that I do not believe that Mr. Orage even noticed
the break in the rhythm.

During this period, Gurdjieff acquired notoriety as "the man who killed Katherine Mansfield" after Katherine Mansfield died there of tuberculosis under his care on 9 January 1923. However, James Moore and Ouspensky argue that Mansfield knew she would soon die and that Gurdjieff made her last days happy and fulfilling.

First car accident, writing and visits to North America

Starting in 1924, Gurdjieff made visits to North America, where he eventually received the pupils taught previously by A.R. Orage. In 1924, while driving alone from Paris to Fontainebleau, he had a near-fatal car accident. Nursed by his wife and mother, he made a slow and painful recovery against medical expectation. Still convalescent, he formally "disbanded" his institute on 26 August (in fact, he dispersed only his "less dedicated" pupils), which he explained as an undertaking "in the future, under the pretext of different worthy reasons, to remove from my eyesight all those who by this or that make my life too comfortable".

After recovering, he began writing Beelzebub's Tales, the first part of All and Everything in a mixture of Armenian and Russian. The book was deliberately convoluted and obscure, forcing the reader to "work" to find its meaning. He also composed it according to his own principles, writing in noisy cafes to force a greater effort of concentration.

Gurdjieff's mother died in 1925 and his wife developed cancer and died in June 1926. Ouspensky attended her funeral. According to Fritz Peters, Gurdjieff was in New York from November 1925 to the spring of 1926, when he succeeded in raising over $100,000. He was to make six or seven trips to the US, where he alienated a number of people with his brash and impudent demands for money. Some have interpreted that in terms of his following the Malamatiyya technique of the Sufis, he was deliberately attracting disapproval.

A Chicago-based Gurdjieff group was founded by Jean Toomer in 1927 after he had trained in Prieuré for a year. Diana Huebert was a regular member of the Chicago group, and documented the several visits Gurdjieff made to the group in 1932 and 1934 in her memoirs on the man.

Despite his fund-raising efforts in America, the Prieuré operation ran into debt and was shut down in 1932. Gurdjieff constituted a new teaching group in Paris. Known as The Rope, it was composed of only women, many of them writers, and several  lesbians. Members included Kathryn Hulme, Jane Heap, Margaret Anderson and Enrico Caruso's widow, Dorothy. Gurdjieff became acquainted with Gertrude Stein through Rope members, but she was never a follower.

In 1935, Gurdjieff stopped work on All and Everything. He had completed the first two parts of the planned trilogy but only started on the Third Series. (It was later published under the title Life Is Real Only Then, When 'I Am'.) In 1936, he settled in a flat at 6, Rue des Colonels-Renard in Paris, where he was to stay for the rest of his life. In 1937, his brother Dmitry died, and The Rope disbanded.

World War II
Although the flat at 6 Rue des Colonels-Renard was very small for the purpose, he continued to teach groups of pupils throughout World War II. Visitors recalled the pantry, stocked with an extraordinary collection of eastern delicacies, which served as his inner sanctum, and the suppers he held with elaborate toasts to "idiots" in vodka and cognac. Having cut a physically impressive figure for many years, he was now distinctly paunchy. His teaching was now far removed from the original "system", being based on proverbs, jokes and personal interaction, although pupils were required to read, three times if possible, copies of his magnum opus Beelzebub's Tales.

His personal business enterprises (he had intermittently been a dealer in oriental rugs and carpets for much of his life, among other activities) enabled him to offer charitable relief to neighbours who had been affected by the difficult circumstances of the war, and it also brought him to the attention of the authorities, leading to a night in the cells.

Final years

After the war, Gurdjieff tried to reconnect with his former pupils. Ouspensky was reluctant, but after his death (October 1947), his widow advised his remaining pupils to see Gurdjieff in Paris. J. G. Bennett also visited from England, their first meeting in 25 years. Ouspensky's pupils in England had all thought that Gurdjieff was dead. They discovered he was alive only after the death of Ouspensky, who had not told them that Gurdjieff was still living. They were overjoyed to hear so, and many of Ouspensky's pupils including Rina Hands, Basil Tilley and Catherine Murphy visited Gurdjieff in Paris. Hands and Murphy worked on the typing and retyping of the forthcoming book All and Everything.

Gurdjieff suffered a second car accident in 1948 but again made an unexpected recovery.

"[I] was looking at a dying man. Even this is not enough to express it. It was a dead man, a corpse, that came out of the car; and yet it walked. I was shivering like someone who sees a ghost."

With iron-like tenacity, he managed to gain his room, where he sat down and said: "Now all organs are destroyed. Must make new". Then, he turned to Bennett, smiling: "Tonight you come dinner. I must make body work". As he spoke, a great spasm of pain shook his body and blood gushed from an ear. Bennett thought: "He has a cerebral haemorrhage. He will kill himself if he continues to force his body to move". But then he reflected: "He has to do all this. If he allows his body to stop moving, he will die. He has power over his body".

After recovering, Gurdjieff finalised plans for the official publication of Beelzebub's Tales and made two trips to New York. He also visited the famous prehistoric cave paintings at Lascaux, giving his interpretation of their significance to his pupils.

Gurdjieff died of cancer at the American Hospital in Neuilly-sur-Seine, France. His funeral took place at the St. Alexandre Nevsky Russian Orthodox Cathedral at 12 Rue Daru, Paris. He is buried in the cemetery at Avon (near Fontainebleau).

Children
Although no evidence or documents have certified anyone as a child of Gurdjieff, the following six people are believed to be his children:
 Nikolai Stjernvall (1919–2010), whose mother was Elizaveta Grigorievna, wife of Leonid Robertovich de Stjernvall.
 Michel de Salzmann (1923–2001), whose mother was Jeanne Allemand de Salzmann; he later became head of the Gurdjieff Foundation.
 Cynthie Sophia "Dushka" Howarth (1924–2010); her mother was dancer Jessmin Howarth. She went on to found the Gurdjieff Heritage Society.
 Eve Taylor (born 1928), whose mother was one of his followers, American socialite Edith Annesley Taylor.
 Sergei Chaverdian; his mother was Lily Galumnian Chaverdian.
 Andrei, born to a mother known only as Georgii.

Gurdjieff had a niece, Luba Gurdjieff Everitt, who for about 40 years (1950s–1990s) ran a small but rather famous restaurant, Luba's Bistro, in Knightsbridge, London.

Ideas
Gurdjieff believed that people cannot perceive reality in their current condition because they do not possess a unified consciousness but rather live in a state of a hypnotic "waking sleep".

"Man lives his life in sleep, and in sleep he dies."
As a result of this each person perceives things from a completely subjective perspective. He asserted that people in their typical state function as unconscious automatons, but that a person can "wake up" and become a different sort of human being altogether.

Some contemporary researchers claim Gurdjieff's concept of self-remembering is "close to the Buddhist concept of awareness or a popular definition of 'mindfulness.'... The Buddhist term translated into English as 'mindfulness' originates in the Pali term 'sati,' which is identical to Sanskrit 'smṛti.' Both terms mean 'to remember.

Self-development teachings

Gurdjieff argued that many of the existing forms of religious and spiritual tradition on Earth had lost connection with their original meaning and vitality and so could no longer serve humanity in the way that had been intended at their inception. As a result, humans were failing to realize the truths of ancient teachings and were instead becoming more and more like automatons, susceptible to control from outside and increasingly capable of otherwise unthinkable acts of mass psychosis such as World War I. At best, the various surviving sects and schools could provide only a one-sided development, which did not result in a fully integrated human being.

According to Gurdjieff, only one dimension of the three dimensions of the person—namely, either the emotions, or the physical body or the mind—tends to develop in such schools and sects, and generally at the expense of the other faculties or centers, as Gurdjieff called them. As a result, these paths fail to produce a properly balanced human being. Furthermore, anyone wishing to undertake any of the traditional paths to spiritual knowledge (which Gurdjieff reduced to three—namely the path of the fakir, the path of the monk, and the path of the yogi) were required to renounce life in the world. But Gurdjieff also described a "Fourth Way" which would be amenable to the requirements of modern people living modern lives in Europe and America. Instead of developing body, mind, or emotions separately, Gurdjieff's discipline worked on all three to promote comprehensive and balanced inner development.

In parallel with other spiritual traditions, Gurdjieff taught that a person must expend considerable effort to effect the transformation that leads to awakening. The effort that is put into practice Gurdjieff referred to as "The Work" or "Work on oneself". According to Gurdjieff, "...Working on oneself is not so difficult as wishing to work, taking the decision."
Though Gurdjieff never put major significance on the term "Fourth Way" and never used the term in his writings, his pupil P. D. Ouspensky from 1924 to 1947 made the term and its use central to his own teaching of Gurdjieff's ideas. After Ouspensky's death, his students published a book titled The Fourth Way based on his lectures.

Gurdjieff's teaching addressed the question of humanity's place in the universe and the importance of developing latent potentialities—regarded as our natural endowment as human beings but rarely brought to fruition. He taught that higher levels of consciousness, higher bodies, inner growth and development are real possibilities that nonetheless require conscious work to achieve.

In his teaching Gurdjieff gave a distinct meaning to various ancient texts such as the Bible and many religious prayers. He believed that such texts possess meanings very different from those commonly attributed to them. "Sleep not"; "Awake, for you know not the hour"; and "The Kingdom of Heaven is Within" are examples of biblical statements which point to teachings whose essence has been forgotten.

Gurdjieff taught people how to increase and focus their attention and energy in various ways and to minimize daydreaming and absentmindedness. According to his teaching, this inner development of oneself is the beginning of a possible further process of change, the aim of which is to transform people into what Gurdjieff believed they ought to be.

Distrusting "morality", which he describes as varying from culture to culture, often contradictory and hypocritical, Gurdjieff greatly stressed the importance of "conscience".

To provide conditions in which inner attention could be exercised more intensively, Gurdjieff also taught his pupils "sacred dances" or "movements", later known as the Gurdjieff movements, which they performed together as a group. He also left a body of music, inspired by what he heard in visits to remote monasteries and other places, written for piano in collaboration with one of his pupils, Thomas de Hartmann.

Gurdjieff also used various exercises, such as the "Stop" exercise, to prompt self-observation in his students. Other shocks to help awaken his pupils from constant daydreaming were always possible at any moment.

Methods
"The Work" is in essence a training in the development of consciousness. Gurdjieff used a number of methods and materials, including meetings, music, movements (sacred dance), writings, lectures, and innovative forms of group and individual work. Part of the function of these various methods was to undermine and undo the ingrained habit patterns of the mind and bring about moments of insight. Since each individual has different requirements, Gurdjieff did not have a one-size-fits-all approach, and he adapted and innovated as circumstance required. In Russia he was described as keeping his teaching confined to a small circle, whereas in Paris and North America he gave numerous public demonstrations.

Gurdjieff felt that the traditional methods of self-knowledge—those of the fakir, monk, and yogi (acquired, respectively, through pain, devotion, and study)—were inadequate on their own and often led to various forms of stagnation and one-sidedness. His methods were designed to augment the traditional paths with the purpose of hastening the developmental process. He sometimes called these methods The Way of the Sly Man because they constituted a sort of short-cut through a process of development that might otherwise carry on for years without substantive results. The teacher, more adept, sees the individual requirements of the disciple and sets tasks that he knows will result in a transformation of consciousness in that individual. Instructive historical parallels can be found in the annals of Zen Buddhism, where teachers employed a variety of methods (sometimes highly unorthodox) to bring about the arising of insight in the student.

Music
Gurdjieff's music divides into three distinct periods. The "first period" is the early music, including music from the ballet Struggle of the Magicians and music for early movements dating to the years around 1918.

The "second period" music, for which Gurdjieff arguably became best known, written in collaboration with Russian composer Thomas de Hartmann, is described as the Gurdjieff-de Hartmann music.  Dating to the mid-1920s, it offers a rich repertoire with roots in Caucasian and Central Asian folk and religious music, Russian Orthodox liturgical music, and other sources. This music was often first heard in the salon at the Prieuré, where much was composed. Since the publication of four volumes of this piano repertoire by Schott, recently completed, there has been a wealth of new recordings, including orchestral versions of music prepared by Gurdjieff and de Hartmann for the Movements demonstrations of 1923–24. Solo piano versions of these works have been recorded by Cecil Lytle, Keith Jarrett,  Frederic Chiu.

The "last musical period" is the improvised harmonium music which often followed the dinners Gurdjieff held at his Paris apartment during the Occupation and immediate post-war years to his death in 1949. In all, Gurdjieff in collaboration with de Hartmann composed some 200 pieces. In May 2010, 38 minutes of unreleased solo piano music on acetate was purchased by Neil Kempfer Stocker from the estate of his late step-daughter, Dushka Howarth. In 2009, pianist Elan Sicroff released Laudamus: The Music of Georges Ivanovitch Gurdjieff and Thomas de Hartmann, consisting of a selection of Gurdjieff/de Hartmann collaborations (as well as three early romantic works composed by de Hartmann in his teens). In 1998 Alessandra Celletti released "Hidden Sources" (Kha Records) with 18 tracks by Gurdjieff/de Hartmann.

The English concert pianist and composer Helen Perkin (married name Helen Adie) came to Gurdjieff through Ouspensky and first visited Gurdjieff in Paris after the war. She and her husband George Adie emigrated to Australia in 1965 and established the Gurdjieff Society of Newport. Recordings of her performing music by Thomas de Hartmann were issued on CD. But she was also a Movements teacher and composed music for the Movements as well.  Some of this music has been published and privately circulated.

Movements

Movements, or sacred dances, constitute an integral part of the Gurdjieff Work. Gurdjieff sometimes referred to himself as a "teacher of dancing" and gained initial public notice for his attempts to put on a ballet in Moscow called Struggle of the Magicians.

In Views from the Real World Gurdjieff wrote, "You ask about the aim of the movements. To each position of the body corresponds a certain inner state and, on the other hand, to each inner state corresponds a certain posture. A man, in his life, has a certain number of habitual postures and he passes from one to another without stopping at those between. Taking new, unaccustomed postures enables you to observe yourself inside differently from the way you usually do in ordinary conditions."

Films of movements demonstrations are occasionally shown for private viewing by the Gurdjieff Foundations, and one is shown in a scene in the Peter Brook movie Meetings with Remarkable Men.

Writings
Gurdjieff wrote a unique trilogy with the Series title All and Everything. The first volume, finalized by Gurdjieff shortly before his death and first published in 1950, is the First Series and titled An Objectively Impartial Criticism of the Life of Man or Beelzebub's Tales to His Grandson. At 1238 pages it is a lengthy allegorical work that recounts the explanations of Beelzebub to his grandson concerning the beings of the planet Earth and laws which govern the universe. It provides a vast platform for Gurdjieff's deeply considered philosophy. A controversial redaction of Beelzebub's Tales was published by some of Gurdjieff's followers as an alternative "edition", in 1992. [See Paul Beekman Taylor's' Gurdjieff's Worlds of Words (2014) for an informed account.] On his page of Friendly Advice facing the first Contents page of Beelzebub's Tales Gurdjieff lays out his own program of three obligatory initial readings of each of the three series in sequence and concludes, "Only then will you be able to count upon forming your own impartial judgement, proper to yourself alone, on my writings. And only then can my hope be actualized that according to your understanding you will obtain the specific benefit for your self which I anticipate."

The posthumous second series, edited by Jeanne de Salzmann, is titled Meetings with Remarkable Men (1963) and is written in a seemingly accessible manner as a memoir of his early years, but also contains some 'Arabian Nights' embellishments and allegorical statements. His posthumous Third Series, (Life Is Real Only Then, When 'I Am'), written as if unfinished and also edited by Jeanne de Salzmann, contains an intimate account of Gurdjieff's inner struggles during his later years, as well as transcripts of some of his lectures. An enormous and growing amount has been written about Gurdjieff's ideas and methods, but his own challenging writings remain the primary sources.

Reception and influence
Opinions on Gurdjieff's writings and activities are divided. Sympathizers regard him as a charismatic master who brought new knowledge into Western culture, a psychology and cosmology that enable insights beyond those provided by established science. At the other end of the spectrum, some critics assert he was a charlatan with a large ego and a constant need for self-glorification. Gurdjieff had significant influence on some artists, writers, and thinkers, including Walter Inglis Anderson, Peter Brook, Kate Bush, Darby Crash, Muriel Draper, Robert Fripp, Keith Jarrett, Timothy Leary, Katherine Mansfield, Dennis Lewis, James Moore, A. R. Orage, P. D. Ouspensky, Maurice Nicoll, Louis Pauwels, Robert S de Ropp, René Barjavel, Rene Daumal, George Russell, David Sylvian, Jean Toomer, Jeremy Lane, Therion, P. L. Travers, Alan Watts, Minor White, Colin Wilson, Robert Anton Wilson, Frank Lloyd Wright, John Zorn, and  Franco Battiato.

Gurdjieff's notable personal students include P. D. Ouspensky, Olga de Hartmann, Thomas de Hartmann, Jane Heap, Jeanne de Salzmann, Willem Nyland, Lord Pentland (Henry John Sinclair), John G. Bennett, Alfred Richard Orage, Maurice Nicoll, and Rene Daumal.

Gurdjieff gave new life and practical form to ancient teachings of both East and West. For example, the Socratic and Platonic emphasis on "the examined life" recurs in Gurdjieff's teaching as the practice of self-observation. His teachings about self-discipline and restraint reflect Stoic teachings. The Hindu and Buddhist notion of attachment recurs in Gurdjieff's teaching as the concept of identification. His descriptions of the "three being-foods" matches that of Ayurveda, and his statement that "time is breath" echoes jyotish, the Vedic system of astrology.  Similarly, his cosmology can be "read" against ancient and esoteric sources, respectively Neoplatonic and in such sources as Robert Fludd's treatment of macrocosmic musical structures.

An aspect of Gurdjieff's teachings which has come into prominence in recent decades is the enneagram geometric figure. For many students of the Gurdjieff tradition, the enneagram remains a koan, challenging and never fully explained. There have been many attempts to trace the origins of this version of the enneagram; some similarities to other figures have been found, but it seems that Gurdjieff was the first person to make the enneagram figure publicly known and that only he knew its true source. Others have used the enneagram figure in connection with personality analysis, principally with the Enneagram of Personality as developed by Oscar Ichazo, Claudio Naranjo  and others.  Most aspects of this application are not directly connected to Gurdjieff's teaching or to his explanations of the enneagram.

Gurdjieff inspired the formation of many groups after his death, all of which still function today and follow his ideas.  The Gurdjieff Foundation, the largest establishment organization influenced by the ideas of Gurdjieff, was organized by Jeanne de Salzmann during the early 1950s, and led by her in cooperation with other pupils of his. Other pupils of Gurdjieff formed independent groups. Willem Nyland, one of Gurdjieff's closest students and an original founder and trustee of The Gurdjieff Foundation of New York, left to form his own groups in the early 1960s. Jane Heap was sent to London by Gurdjieff, where she led groups until her death in 1964. Louise Goepfert March, who became a pupil of Gurdjieff's in 1929, started her own groups in 1957 and founded the Rochester Folk Art Guild in the Finger Lakes region of New York State. Independent thriving groups were also formed and initially led by John G. Bennett and A. L. Staveley near Portland, Oregon.

Pupils

Gurdjieff's notable pupils include:

Peter D. Ouspensky (1878–1947) was a Russian journalist, author and philosopher. He met Gurdjieff in 1915 and spent the next five years studying with him, then formed his own independent groups at London in 1921. Ouspensky became the first "career" Gurdjieffian and led independent Fourth Way groups in London and New York for his remaining years. He wrote In Search of the Miraculous about his encounters with Gurdjieff and it remains the best known and most widely read account of Gurdjieff's early experiments with groups.

Thomas de Hartmann (1885–1956) was a Russian composer. He and his wife Olga first met Gurdjieff in 1916 at Saint Petersburg. They remained Gurdjieff's close students until 1929. During that time they lived at Gurdjieff's Institute for the Harmonious Development of Man near Paris. Between July 1925 and May 1927 Thomas de Hartmann transcribed and co-wrote some of the music that Gurdjieff collected and used for his Movements exercises. They collaborated on hundreds of pieces of concert music arranged for the piano. This concert music was first recorded and published privately from the 1950s to 1980s; then first issued publicly as the Music of Gurdjieff / de Hartmann, Thomas de Hartmann, piano by Triangle Records, with 49 tracks on 4 vinyl disks in 1998, then reissued as a 3-CD set in containing 56 tracks in 1989. A more extensive compilation was later issued as the Gurdjieff / de Hartmann Music for the Piano in 4 printed volumes by Schott between 1996 and 2005, and as audio CDs under the same title in four volumes with nine discs recorded with three concert pianists, by Schott/Wergo between 1997 and 2001.  Olga de Hartmann (née Arkadievna, 1885–1987) was Gurdjieff's personal secretary during their Prieuré years and took most of the original dictations of his writings during that period. She also authenticated Gurdjieff's early talks in the book Views from the Real World (1973). The de Hartmanns' memoir, Our Life with Mr Gurdjieff (1st ed, 1964, 2nd ed, 1983, 3rd ed 1992), records their Gurdjieff years in great detail. Their Montreal Gurdjieff group, literary and musical estate is represented by retired Canadian National Film Board producer Tom Daly.

Jeanne de Salzmann (1889–1990). Alexander and Jeanne de Salzmann met Gurdjieff in Tiflis in 1919. She was originally a dancer, a Dalcroze Eurythmics teacher. She was, along with Jessmin Howarth and Rose Mary Nott, responsible for transmitting Gurdjieff's choreographed movement exercises and institutionalizing Gurdjieff's teachings through the Gurdjieff Foundation of New York, the Gurdjieff Institute of Paris, London's Gurdjieff Society Inc., and other groups she established in 1953. She also established Triangle Editions in the US, which imprint claims copyright on all Gurdjieff's posthumous writings.

John G. Bennett (1897–1974) was a British intelligence officer, polyglot (fluent in English, French, German, Turkish, Greek, Italian), technologist, industrial research director, author, and teacher, best known for his many books on psychology and spirituality, particularly the teachings of Gurdjieff. Bennett met both Ouspensky and then Gurdjieff at Istanbul in 1920, spent August 1923 at Gurdjieff's Institute, became Ouspensky's pupil between 1922 and 1941 and, after learning that Gurdjieff was still alive, was one of Gurdjieff's frequent visitors in Paris during 1949. See Witness: the Autobiography of John Bennett (1974), Gurdjieff: Making a New World(1974), Idiots in Paris: diaries of J. G. Bennett and Elizabeth Bennett, 1949 (1991).

Alfred Richard Orage (1873–1934) was an influential British editor best known for the magazine New Age. He began attending Ouspensky's London talks in 1921 then met Gurdjieff when the latter first visited London early in 1922. Shortly thereafter, Orage sold New Age and relocated to Gurdjieff's institute at the Prieré, and in 1924 was appointed by Gurdjieff to lead the institute's branch in New York. After Gurdjieff's nearly fatal automobile accident in July 1924 and because of his prolonged recuperation during 1924 and intense writing period for several years, Orage continued in New York until 1931. During this period, Orage was responsible for editing the English typescript of Beelzebub's Tales (1931) and Meetings with Remarkable Men (1963) as Gurdjieff's assistant. This period is described in some detail by Paul Beekman Taylor in his Gurdjieff and Orage: Brothers in Elysium (2001).

Maurice Nicoll (1884–1953) was a Harley Street psychiatrist and Carl Jung's delegate in London. Along with Orage he attended Ouspensky's 1921 London talks where he met Gurdjieff. With his wife Catherine and their daughter, he spent almost a year at Gurdjieff's Prieuré institute. A year later, when they returned to London, Nicoll rejoined Ouspensky's group. In 1931, on Ouspensky's advice he started his own Fourth Way groups in England. He is best known for the encyclopedic six-volume series of articles in Psychological Commentaries on the Teaching of Gurdjieff and Ouspensky (Boston: Shambhala, 1996, and Samuel Weiser Inc., 1996).

Willem Nyland (1890–1975) was a Dutch-American chemist who first met Gurdjieff early in 1924 during the latter's first visit to the US. He was a charter member of the NY branch of Gurdjieff's Institute, participated in Orage's meetings between 1924 and 1931, and was a charter member of the Gurdjieff Foundation from 1953 and through its formative years. In the early 1960s he established an independent group in Warwick NY, where he began making reel-to-reel audio recordings of his meetings, which became archived in a private library of some 2600 90-minute audio tapes. Many of these tapes have also been transcribed and indexed, but remain unpublished. Gurdjieff Group Work with Wilhem (sic-Willem) Nyland (1983) by Irmis B. Popoff, sketches Nyland's group work.

Jane Heap (1883–1964) was an American writer, editor, artist, and publisher. She met Gurdjieff during his 1924 visit to New York, and set up a Gurdjieff study group at her apartment in Greenwich Village. In 1925, she moved to Paris to study at Gurdjieff's Institute, and re-established her group in Paris until 1935 when Gurdjieff sent her to London to lead the group C. S. Nott had established and which she continued to lead until her death. Jane Heap's Paris group became Gurdjieff's 'Rope' group after her departure, and contained several notable writers, including Margaret Anderson, Solita Solano, Kathryn Hulme, and others who proved helpful to Gurdjieff while he was editing his first two books.

Kenneth Macfarlane Walker (1882–1966) was a prominent British surgeon and prolific author. He was a member of Ouspensky's London group for decades, and after the latter's death in 1947 visited Gurdjieff in Paris many times. As well as many accessible medical books for lay readers, he wrote some of the earliest informed accounts of Gurdjieff's ideas, Venture with Ideas (1951) and A Study of Gurdjieff's Teaching (1957).

Henry John Sinclair, 2nd Baron Pentland (1907–1984) was a pupil of Ouspensky's during the 1930s and 1940s. He visited Gurdjieff regularly in Paris in 1949, then was appointed as President of the Gurdjieff Foundation of America by Jeanne de Salzmann when she founded that institution at New York in 1953. He established the Gurdjieff Foundation of California in the mid-1950s and remained President of the US Foundation branches until his death. Pentland also became President of Triangle Editions when it was established in 1974.

Critics
Louis Pauwels, among others, criticizes Gurdjieff for his insistence on considering people as "asleep" in a state closely resembling "hypnotic sleep". Gurdjieff said, even specifically at times, that a pious, good, and moral person was no more "spiritually developed" than any other person; they are all equally "asleep".

Henry Miller approved of Gurdjieff not considering himself holy but, after writing a brief introduction to Fritz Peters' book Boyhood with Gurdjieff, Miller wrote that people are not meant to lead a "harmonious life" as Gurdjieff believed in naming his institute.

Critics note that Gurdjieff gives no value to most of the elements that compose the life of an average person. According to Gurdjieff, everything an average person possesses, accomplishes, does, and feels is completely accidental and without any initiative. A common everyday ordinary person is born a machine and dies a machine without any chance of being anything else. This belief seems to run counter to the Judeo-Christian tradition that man is a living soul. Gurdjieff believed that the possession of a soul (a state of psychological unity which he equated with being "awake") was a "luxury" that a disciple could attain only by the most painstaking work over a long period of time. The majority—in whom the true meaning of the gospel failed to take root—went the "broad way" that "led to destruction."

In Beelzebub's Tales to His Grandson (see bibliography), Gurdjieff expresses his reverence for the founders of the mainstream religions of East and West and his contempt (by and large) for what successive generations of believers have made of those religious teachings. His discussions of "orthodoxhydooraki" and "heterodoxhydooraki"—orthodox fools and heterodox fools, from the Russian word durak (fool)—position him as a critic of religious distortion and, in turn, as a target for criticism from some within those traditions.  Gurdjieff has been interpreted by some, Ouspensky among others, to have had a total disregard for the value of mainstream religion, philanthropic work and the value of doing right or wrong in general.

Gurdjieff's former students who have criticized him argue that, despite his seeming total lack of pretension to any kind of "guru holiness", in many anecdotes his behavior displays the unsavory and impure character of a man who was a cynical manipulator of his followers. Gurdjieff's own pupils wrestled to understand him. For example, in a written exchange between Luc Dietrich and Henri Tracol dating to 1943: "L.D.: How do you know that Gurdjieff wishes you well? H.T.: I feel sometimes how little I interest him—and how strongly he takes an interest in me. By that I measure the strength of an intentional feeling."

Louis Pauwels wrote Monsieur Gurdjieff (first edition published in Paris in 1954 by Editions du Seuil). In an interview, Pauwels said of the Gurdjieff work: "... After two years of exercises which both enlightened and burned me, I found myself in a hospital bed with a thrombosed central vein in my left eye and weighing ninety-nine pounds... Horrible anguish and abysses opened up for me. But it was my fault."

Pauwels believed that Karl Haushofer, the father of geopolitics whose protégée was Deputy Reich Führer Rudolf Hess, was one of the real "seekers after truth" described by Gurdjieff. According to Rom Landau, a journalist in the 1930s, Achmed Abdullah told him at the beginning of the 20th century that Gurdjieff was a Russian secret agent in Tibet who went by the name of "Hambro Akuan Dorzhieff" (i.e. Agvan Dorjiev), a tutor to the Dalai Lama. However, the actual Dorzhieff went to live in the Buddhist temple erected in St. Petersburg and after the revolution was imprisoned by Stalin. James Webb conjectured that Gurdjieff might have been Dorzhieff's assistant Ushe Narzunoff (i.e. Ovshe Norzunov).

Colin Wilson writes about "...Gurdjieff's reputation for seducing his female students. (In Providence, Rhode Island, in 1960, a man was pointed out to me as one of Gurdjieff's illegitimate children. The professor who told me this also assured me that Gurdjieff had left many children around America.)"

In The Oragean Version, C. Daly King surmised that the problem that Gurdjieff had with Orage's teachings was that the "Oragean Version", Orage himself, was not emotional enough in Gurdjieff's estimation and had not enough "incredulity" and faith. King wrote that Gurdjieff did not state it as clearly and specifically as this, but was quick to add that, to him, nothing Gurdjieff said was specific or clear.

According to Osho, the Gurdjieff system is incomplete, drawing from Dervish sources inimical to Kundalini.  Some Sufi orders, such as the Naqshbandi, draw from and are amenable to Kundalini.

The Teachers of Gurdjieff, a book by "Rafael Lefort" was published in 1966. It suggested that Gurdjieff's teachings were actually derived from those of Naqshbandi Sufis. The book has since been attributed to the Sufi school of the brothers Idries Shah and Omar Ali-Shah, its authenticity questioned, and even described by Gurdjieff biographer James Moore as a "distasteful fabrication". Gurdjieffian student and writer John G. Bennett also claimed that "more than anything else", Gurdjieff was a Sufi. Though this view has been questioned "by more orthodox followers of Gurdjieff", it is claimed by other researchers such as William James Thompson and Anna Challenger that textual analysis of Gurdjieff's works shows references to Islamic and Sufi figures, including the Naqshbandi and the wise fool of Sufic folklore, Mulla Nasrudin.

Bibliography
Three books by Gurdjieff were published in the English language in the United States after his death: Beelzebub's Tales to His Grandson published in 1950 by E. P. Dutton & Co. Inc., Meetings with Remarkable Men, published in 1963 by E. P. Dutton & Co. Inc., and Life is Real Only Then, When 'I Am', printed privately by E. P. Dutton & Co. and published in 1978 by Triangle Editions Inc. for private distribution only. This trilogy is Gurdjieff's legominism, known collectively as All and Everything. A legominism is, according to Gurdjieff, "one of the means of transmitting information about certain events of long-past ages through initiates". A book of his early talks was also collected by his student and personal secretary, Olga de Hartmann, and published in 1973 as Views from the Real World: Early Talks in Moscow, Essentuki, Tiflis, Berlin, London, Paris, New York, and Chicago, as recollected by his pupils.

Gurdjieff's views were initially promoted through the writings of his pupils. The best known and widely read of these is P. D. Ouspensky's In Search of the Miraculous: Fragments of an Unknown Teaching, which is widely regarded as a crucial introduction to the teaching. Others refer to Gurdjieff's own books as the primary texts. Numerous anecdotal accounts of time spent with Gurdjieff were published by Charles Stanley Nott, Thomas and Olga de Hartmann, Fritz Peters, René Daumal, John G. Bennett, Maurice Nicoll, Margaret Anderson and Louis Pauwels, among others.

The feature film Meetings with Remarkable Men (1979), loosely based on Gurdjieff's book by the same name, ends with performances of Gurdjieff's dances known simply as the "exercises" but later promoted as movements. Jeanne de Salzmann and Peter Brook wrote the film, Brook directed, and Dragan Maksimovic and Terence Stamp star, as does South African playwright and actor Athol Fugard.

Books
 
 
All and Everything trilogy:
 </ref>

See also
 In Search of the Miraculous

References
Notes

Citations

Further reading
 Jean Vaysse, Toward Awakening, An Approach to the Teaching Left by Gurdjieff. London: Routledge & Kegan Paul, 1980, .

External links

 International Association of Gurdjieff Foundations
 Gurdjieff Reading Guide compiled by J. Walter Driscoll.  Fifty-two articles which provide an independent survey of the literature by or about George Ivanovitch Gurdjieff and offer a wide range of informed opinion (admiring, critical, and contradictory) about him, his activities, writings, philosophy, and influence.
 Writings on Gurdjieff's teachings in the Elizabeth Jenks Clark Collection of Margaret Anderson Papers at Yale University Beinecke Rare Book and Manuscript Library
 Howarth Gurdjieff Archive at The New York Public Library
 George Gurdjieff: "Seeker of Truth" A video documentary on Gurdjieff's life and teaching.

 
19th-century births
1949 deaths
People from Gyumri
People from Erivan Governorate
Fourth Way
20th-century Russian philosophers
Russian spiritual writers
20th-century mystics
Spiritual teachers
New Age predecessors
Russian hypnotists
Burials in Île-de-France
People from the Russian Empire of Armenian descent
People from the Russian Empire of Greek descent